The Aeronautical Code signals are radio signal codes. They are part of a larger set of Q Codes allocated by the ITU-R. The QAA–QNZ code range includes phrases applicable primarily to the aeronautical service,[2] as defined by the International Civil Aviation Organisation.

First defined in ICAO publication "Doc 6100-COM/504/1" in 1948 and in "ICAO Procedures for Air Navigation Services, Abbreviations and Codes (PAN
a S-ABC)" [Doc8400-4] (4th edition 1989), the majority of the Q codes have slipped out of common use; for example today reports such as QAU ("I am about to jettison fuel") and QAZ ("I am flying in a storm") would be voice or computerized transmissions. But several remain part of the standard ICAO radiotelephony phraseology in aviation.

References

Amateur radio
Encodings
Morse code
Brevity codes
1948 in radio
1948 in aviation
1989 in radio
1989 in aviation